Ivan Ilić (born 14 February 1971) is a Serbian former footballer who played as a defender and made four appearances for the FR Yugoslavia national team.

Career
Ilić made his international debut for FR Yugoslavia on 16 January 2001 in the Millennium Super Soccer Cup against Bangladesh, which finished as a 4–1 win. He made four appearances in total, his last on 25 January 2001 in the final of the Millennium Super Soccer Cup against Bosnia and Herzegovina, which finished as a 2–0 win.

Career statistics

International

References

External links
 

1971 births
Living people
Serbian footballers
Yugoslav footballers
Serbia and Montenegro footballers
Serbia and Montenegro international footballers
Serbian expatriate footballers
Serbian expatriate sportspeople in Belgium
Serbia and Montenegro expatriate sportspeople in Belgium
Expatriate footballers in Belgium
Association football defenders
FK Radnički Niš players
FK Vojvodina players
Royal Antwerp F.C. players
Yugoslav First League players
First League of Serbia and Montenegro players
Belgian Pro League players